The New Hill Historic District is a national historic district located at New Hill, North Carolina, an unincorporated community in southwestern Wake County. The district encompasses the commercial and residential center and includes , 59 buildings, and one structure. The district developed between about 1860 and 1950, and includes notable examples of Colonial Revival and Tudor Revival style architecture. Notable buildings include the W. T. Roundy commercial complex, C.J. Bright's general merchandise store or New Hill Emporium, W. T. Roundy House (c. 1928), Duncan Lashley House (c. 1860), John Bright House (c. 1912), New Hill Baptist Church (c. 1888), Glass-Gardner House (c. 1890), and several farm complexes.

It was listed on the National Register of Historic Places in 2001.

See also
 List of Registered Historic Places in North Carolina

References

Historic districts on the National Register of Historic Places in North Carolina
Colonial Revival architecture in North Carolina
Tudor Revival architecture in North Carolina
Buildings and structures in Wake County, North Carolina
National Register of Historic Places in Wake County, North Carolina